Fengfeng may refer to:

Fengfeng Mining District, a district in Handan, Hebei, China
Fengfeng Town, a town in Fengfeng Mining District
Fengfeng Subdistrict (冯封街道), a subdistrict in Zhongzhan District, Jiaozuo, Henan, China

See also
Feng Feng (disambiguation) for people